Abdul Nabi also spelled Abd al-Nabi or Abdol Nabi  is a Muslim name occurring throughout the Islamic world, translating to "Servant of the Prophet."

Given Names

 Abdul-Nabi Namazi (born 1945), Iranian Cleric
 Abdul-Nabi Isstaif, (born 1952), Syrian Professor
 Abdul Nabi Bangash, (born 1954), Pakistani Politician
 Abdul-Nabi Mousavi Fard (born 1956), Iranian Cleric

See Also
 Muhammad

Arabic masculine given names